Neocalliostoma is a genus of sea snails, marine gastropod mollusks in the family Calliostomatidae within the superfamily Trochoidea, the top snails, turban snails and their allies.

Species
 Neocalliostoma militare (Ihering, 1907) is a synonym of  Calliostoma militare Ihering, 1907

References

External links
 To World Register of Marine Species

 
Calliostomatidae